Election interference may refer to:

 Electoral fraud, illegal interference with the process of an election
 Vote buying, when a political party or candidate distributes money to a voter with the expectation that they will vote for them
 Voter impersonation, when an eligible voter votes more than once or a non-eligible voter votes under the name of an eligible one
 Foreign electoral intervention, attempts by governments to influence elections in another country

See also 
 Election security, the protection of elections and voting infrastructure from cyberattack or cyber threat
 Election audit, a review conducted to determine whether votes were counted accurately or whether proper procedures were followed